Oliver Biles (born 15 March 1990) is a British-born Eurasian actor and poker player.

Career
Biles trained at Mountview Academy of Theatre Arts in London, before his debut role in the 2011's Yellow Earth Theatre production of Why the Lion Danced, which toured the UK. Biles worked again with Yellow Earth Theatre on Dim Sum Nights - The Clean Up, opposite Jessica Henwick.
In the same year Biles made his screen debut in the children's show House of Anubis, on Nickelodeon. In 2012 Biles performed in the premiere of the stage adaptation of Wild Swans produced by the Young Vic Theatre, opposite Katie Leung.

Biles has also performed in commercials and short films.

Filmography

Theatre

Poker 
Biles has been an avid Poker player since 2011 and has most recently transitioned into full-time play in 2018 whilst he takes a break from his Acting career. In 2018 he travelled to Las Vegas for the World Series of Poker where he cashed in three events. He is currently travelling the world whilst playing Poker to support his endeavours.

Results

References

Living people
British male actors of Chinese descent
English people of Chinese descent
English male child actors
English poker players
English male stage actors
English male film actors
1990 births